Irma Patricia Aguayo, also known as Patricia Aguayo, is a Chicano Park muralist and longtime activist.  She was born and raised in San Diego, California. Both of her parents are from Mexico and she grew up in a Mexican culture household but was told by her parents that in order to succeed in America to act American outside her house. It was in middle school after meeting with her counselor, Ms. Barrios, where she first heard someone of Mexican descent call themselves Chicana that Aguayo realized that she also identified as Chicana. After researching Chicana artists, she realized that there weren't a lot of artists.  So she decided that she would create her own artwork.

Aguayo began painting at the age of 14, depicting many shades of brown on her canvas. In her 20s she worked a full-time job but felt trapped and decided to quit her job and start working part-time to develop her art. After a lot of insisting she was allowed to restore a temporary mural at Chicano Park in San Diego. With the restoration of the mural she was given the title of muralist. She has continued to paint at Chicano Park and work on community public art projects with people of different culture. She is now a part of the Chicano Park Steering Committee.

Artworks

Three Wise Men 
This 2019 acrylic painting depicts three men, Jesse Constancio, Ramon "Chunky" Sanchez, and Howard Holman. Jesse Constancio, painted wearing a Chargers Football team hat, was a season ticket holder for over 22 years and was present at the town hall meeting to discuss the future of the football team. Ramon "Chunky" Sanchez, a Chicano Musician who died in 2016, was the co-founder of the band ' Los Alacranes' and was an activist for the Chicano Civil Rights and Laborers Movement. Howard Holman was a leader who dedicated his life to fight for the betterment of his community in San Diego.

Chicano Parks 
A 2019 acrylic painting depicts the Chicano Park takeover on April 22, 1970, when the Aztlan Flag was raised.

Cruisin Barrio Logan 
An acrylic painting done in 2018. The painting is of Barrio Logan located in San Diego, California. Barrio Logan is home to Chicano Park where Aguayo has many mural style art.

Corona de Alcatraces 
An acrylic painting done in 2016. The painting is of an indigenous woman with a white alcatraz flower crown around her head.

Other works 
Aguayo has also worked in San Diego Museum of Art as a project coordinator for the public art program. Through that job she was given the opportunity to do another mural in Lemon Grove, San Diego.

Chicana: Liberated & Empowered 
An art exhibition created by Aguayo and Betty Bangs in 2016. Created to display the Chicana Mujerista Spirit that many identify with.

Exhibitions

Solo exhibitions 
 Chicana Perk Coffee Shop

Group exhibitions 
 Chicana: Una Decision Consciente 
 Magia de Mujer 
 Chicano Park Day 
 Ni Solo Mujeres: Intersecting Chicana Identities

References 

Year of birth missing (living people)
Living people
21st-century American women artists
American artists of Mexican descent
American women painters
Artists from San Diego
Women muralists